Temptation's Workshop is a 1932 American pre-Code drama film directed by George B. Seitz and starring Helen Foster, Tyrell Davis and Dorothy Granger. It was released by the independent Poverty Row studio Mayfair Pictures.

Synopsis
When Wall Street financier John Lawton falls ill and goes bankrupt, his children attempt to adjust to the loss of their wealthy upbringing.

Cast
 Helen Foster as Connie Lawton
 Tyrell Davis as Count Emile Borosko
 Dorothy Granger as 	Vi Rantler
 Carroll Nye as Bob Lawton
 John Ince as John Lawton
 Stella Adams as 	Mrs. John Lawton

References

Bibliography
 Pitts, Michael R. Poverty Row Studios, 1929–1940: An Illustrated History of 55 Independent Film Companies, with a Filmography for Each. McFarland & Company, 2005.

External links

1932 films
1932 drama films
American black-and-white films
American drama films
Films directed by George B. Seitz
Mayfair Pictures films
1930s English-language films
1930s American films